Tebhaga Express is an Express train belonging to Eastern Railway Zone that runs between Kolkata and Balurghat.

References

External links
 Indian Railways website

Transport in Kolkata
Named passenger trains of India
Rail transport in West Bengal
Express trains in India